Leyla Tanlar (born 13 December 1997) is a Turkish Italian actress, model and gymnast. She began acting in 2014 drama series Paramparça, portraying Cansu, at the age of 16. Consequently, she had appeared in three television dramas and she is the leading role in 2019 series Ferhat ile Şirin. In December 2021, it reported that she would have a supporting role in the series Kaçış, which premiered on Disney+ in June 2022.

Life and career 
Tanlar was born in Istanbul on 13 December 1997. She is a graduate of the Liceo Italiano di Istanbul. As of 2019, she continues her education at Koç University, Department of Media and Visual Arts. Following her training at the Akademi 35Buçuk, she started her acting career in 2014 with a role in the TV series Paramparça. 
In the same year, she received the 'Most Promising Actor Award' from Gelişim University.
After appearing in a supporting role on the TV series Şahin Tepesi, Tanlar landed her first leading role on Fox's TV series Ferhat ile Şirin as the lead character Şirin.

Filmography

Television

References

External links 
 Leyla Tanlar on IMDb
 Leyla Tanlar on Instagram

1997 births
Actresses from Istanbul
21st-century Turkish actresses
Turkish television actresses
Living people